Punyasthree is a 1986 Indian Telugu-language drama film directed by Ravi Raja Pinisetty. The film stars Rajendra Prasad, Murali and Bhavya, with music composed by Chakravarthy. It is a remake of the Tamil film Aval Sumangalithan (1985).

Plot

Babu Rao, a righteous temple watchman, leads a happy life with his wife Parvathi, daughter Lakshmi, and son Balu. Babu Rao looks at an alliance with Lakshmi. Bhaskar is a civil engineer who is raised by a Christian family, Peter and his sister Stella. Bhaskar weds Lakshmi and all share blossom of love; Now tragically, Bhaskar sense that he is terminally ill with brain cancer. Being aware of it, Lakshmi too dies, showing that the couple is inseparable even in death.

Cast
Rajendra Prasad as Peter
Murali as Bhaskar
Bhavya as Lakshmi
Gollapudi Maruti Rao as Babu Rao
P. J. Sarma as Dr. Sriram Murthy
Ali as Balu
Annapurna as Parvathi
Samyutha as Stella

Soundtrack
Music composed by Chakravarthy. Lyrics were written by Veturi.

References

External links 
 

1980s Telugu-language films
1986 drama films
Films scored by K. Chakravarthy
Indian drama films
Telugu remakes of Tamil films